Gordon Alexander Brown (born 7 December 1965) is a Scottish former professional footballer who played as a central defender. Born in East Kilbride, Brown made one appearance in the English Football League for Rotherham United in the 1983–84 season.

References

1965 births
Living people
Scottish footballers
Rotherham United F.C. players
English Football League players
Association football central defenders